Rainy Lake 18C is a First Nations reserve on Rainy Lake in Rainy River District, Ontario. It is the main reserve of the Mitaanjigamiing First Nation.

References

Ojibwe reserves in Ontario
Communities in Rainy River District